Tosterup Castle is a castle in Tomelilla Municipality, Scania, in southern Sweden.

Owners
List of owners of Tosterup Castle:

Early 1300s – Axel Eskildsen Mule
1300s – His daughter Barbara's husband Torkild Nielsen Brahe
Anders Jacobsen Grim
Dennes son Jens Andersen Grim
Peder Torkildsen Brahe
Their son Axel Pedersen Brahe
His son Peder Axelsen Brahe
1441–1487 – His son Axel Pedersen Brahe, married to Maren Tygesdatter Lunge
1487–1523 – Their son Tyge Axelsen Brahe, married first time to Magdalene Krognos, second time to Sophie Rud
1523–1565 – His son Jörgen Tygesen Brahe, married to Inger Oxe
1565–1571 – His brother Otte Tygesen Brahe, married to Beate Bille
1571–1601 – Their son Jörgen Ottesen Brahe, married to Ingeborg Parsberg
1601–1611 – Their son Tönne Jörgensen Brahe
1611–1615 – His uncle Knud Ottesen Brahe, married to Margrete Eriksdatter Lange
1615–1616 – His brother Axel Ottesen Brahe, married first time to Mette Gjöe, second time to Kirsten Hardenberg
1616–1640 – His son Tyge Axelsen Brahe, married to Birgitte Brock
1640–1656 – Through purchase Otte Tagesen Thott, married first time to Jytte Gyldenstierne, second time to Dorte Rosencrantz
1656–1688 – His daughter Jytte Thott, married to Jörgen Krabbe (d. 1678)
1688–1688 – Her brother-in-law Just Hög
1688–1693 – Through purchase Rutger von Ascheberg, married to Maria Eleonora von Busseck, genannt München
1693–1722 – Their son Christian Ludwig von Ascheberg
1722–1753 – His sister Margareta von Ascheberg, married to Kjell Christoffer Barnekow
1753–1772 – Their son Rutger Barnekow, married to Mariana Lovisa Maclean
1772–1782 – Their daughters Margareta Lovisa, married to Jacob Wilhelm Bennet, and Eleonora Mariana, married to Anders Reinhold Wrangel
1782–1783 – Through purchase Eric Ruuth
1783–1791 – Through purchase Johan Sparre, married to Alexandrine de Cheusses
1791–1810 – His widow Alexandrine de Cheusses
1810–1832 – Through purchase her son-in-law Isaac Lars Silfversparre, married to Sophie Sparre, who was the widow of Carl August Ehrensvärd
1832–1858 – By inheritance and purchase by the latter's son Gustaf Ehrensvärd, married to Henrietta Virginia Sofia Catharina Adlercreutz
1858–1901 – Their son Albert Ehrensvärd, married to Ingeborg Hedvig (Hedda) Vogt
1901–1904 – His widow Hedda Ehrensvärd and their seven children
1904–1944 – Their son Carl August Ehrensvärd along with his siblings and until 1912 his son Augustin Ehrensvärd
1944–1947 – Carl August Ehrensvärd and four cousins
1947–1957 – Carl August Ehrensvärd, married first time to Gisele Dorotée Anna-Luise Marianne Lilla von Bassewitz, second time to Svea Elisabeth Lachman
1957–???? – His son Gustaf Jörgen* Ehrensvärd, married to Ebba Gunilla* Banér
1992–present – Jan Ehrensvärd

See also
List of castles in Sweden

References

Castles in Skåne County